= 12/11 =

12/11 may refer to:

- December 11 (month-day date notation)
- November 12 (day-month date notation)
- 12 shillings and 11 pence in UK predecimal currency
